Slap Shot 3: The Junior League is a 2008 Canadian-American sports film directed by Richard Martin and starring Greyston Holt and Lynda Boyd. It follows a junior version of the Charlestown Chiefs who fight their way to fame with a new coach and the Hanson Brothers in tow. It is the direct-to-video film sequel to the 2002 direct-to-video film Slap Shot 2: Breaking the Ice.

Plot
The Hanson Brothers return to get another team of underdog ice hockey skaters into shape and compete in a big tournament.

External links
 
 
 The Official Home of the Hanson Bros.

2008 direct-to-video films
American ice hockey films
American direct-to-video films
2000s sports comedy films
Direct-to-video sequel films
Universal Pictures direct-to-video films
English-language Canadian films
American sports comedy films
Canadian direct-to-video films
Canadian ice hockey films
Canadian sports comedy films
2008 films
2000s English-language films
2000s American films
2000s Canadian films